Saint Mark United Methodist Church is a United Methodist Church in midtown Atlanta, Georgia. The building was constructed between 1902 and 1903 by the congregation of Merritts Avenue Methodist Church after they outgrew their previous building. The architecture is notable for its use of Stone Mountain granite, triple entrance portal, and pot-metal stained-glass windows. The building is one of the few Gothic Revival granite churches in Atlanta.

The building is listed on the National Register of Historic Places, and is also designated as a historic building by the City of Atlanta.

History
The architect, Willis F. Denny also constructed two other granite Methodist churches that survive today. The congregation chose the location for Saint Mark Methodist Church to give them more room and to be in a less dangerous location than the "Tight Squeeze" area beyond the city limits. The twelve pictorial stained-glass works depicting scenes from the life of Jesus were installed gradually from 1909 to 1959.

In the early 1990s the church was on the verge of closing but the congregation ended up swelling to more than 1700 members during the decade. A fifteen-year series of renovations to the main sanctuary was completed in 2008.

References

External links

 Official website

History of Atlanta
Methodist churches in Atlanta
Churches on the National Register of Historic Places in Georgia (U.S. state)
National Register of Historic Places in Atlanta
City of Atlanta-designated historic sites
1903 establishments in Georgia (U.S. state)
Churches completed in 1903